Heliophanus chikangawanus is a jumping spider species in the genus Heliophanus.  It was first described by Wanda Wesołowska in 1986 and is found in Angola and Mali.

References

Salticidae
Spiders described in 1986
Invertebrates of Angola
Fauna of Mali
Spiders of Africa
Taxa named by Wanda Wesołowska